Tibbles Moore (born 14 September 1974) is a Grenadian cricketer. He played in one first-class and three List A matches for the Windward Islands in 1999/00.

See also
 List of Windward Islands first-class cricketers

References

External links
 

1974 births
Living people
Grenadian cricketers
Windward Islands cricketers